List of K-pop on the Billboard charts is a compilation of chart information for K-pop music published by the Billboard charts, and reported on by Billboard K-Town, an online Billboard column. The charts tabulate the relative weekly popularity of the artists, songs and albums in the United States and globally. This is a list of K-pop musicians and bands and their placement, along with their musical releases, singles, EPs and albums on the Billboard charts.

2009–present

This list depends on continual updates taken from * and *.
 Charts with all updates 2009–present are marked (Complete).
Billboard artists comprehensive update incomplete.
Billboard charts comprehensive update incomplete.
The list is currently minus portions of Psy performance on 58 charts.
The list is exclusive of Korea K-Pop Hot 100 data.
Figures in red highlight indicate the highest rating received by K-pop artists on that chart.
 – Current week's charting

Weekly charts

Album charts

Song charts

All other weekly charts

Artist 100 (Complete)
 Chart started 2014-07-19

Bandsintown X Billboard Rising Livestream Artists (Complete)
 Chart started 2020-07-11
 Chart discontinued after 2021-07-03

Billboard Twitter Emerging Artists / Emerging Artists (Complete)
 Chart started 2014-05-27 and revamped on chart dated 2017-09-02 (without song titles) and renamed Emerging Artists.

Billboard Twitter Top Tracks (Complete)
 Chart started 2014-05-27 and discontinued after 2017-08-26.

Hot Tours
Ranked by Gross. Compiled from Boxscores reported for weekly periods. Only current week retained on chart.
Chart has not updated from 2020-04-01 – present

Next Big Sound (Complete)
 Chart started 2010-12-18
 Chart did not update since 2021-10-02, possibly discontinued

Social 50 (Complete)
 Chart started 2010-12-11.
 Chart halted from 2020-12-26 to present while under revisions.

Spotify Velocity (Complete)
 Chart started 2016-01-23 and discontinued after chart dated 2017-07-22.

Spotify Viral 50 (Complete)
 Chart started 2016-01-23 and discontinued after chart dated 2017-07-22.

Uncharted (Complete)
 Chart started 2011-01-29 and discontinued after chart dated 2014-06-07.

YouTube (Complete)
Chart information starts 2011-08-13.  Chart missing information for 2013-10-26, 2013-11-16, 2014-09-06, 2014-12-12, 2015-05-16.
Discontinued after chart dated 2019-04-06.

Monthly compiled reporting

Hot Tours of the month 
 Chart started 2019-03-23. Ranked by Gross. Compiled from Boxscores reported for monthly periods. Chart data available in Billboard print issues only.

Year-end charts

Decade-end charts

Decade-end, 2010s Digital Song Sales

Decade-end, 2010s Social 50

Decade-end, 2010s Streaming Songs

Decade-end, 2010s Top Touring Artists

See also
 Timeline of K-pop at Billboard
 Timeline of K-pop at Billboard in the 2020s
 Korea K-Pop Hot 100
 List of K-Pop concerts held outside Asia
 List of K-pop artists
 List of South Korean idol groups

Notes

References

External links
Billboard popular charts - subscription only except Hot 100, Billboard 200 and Artist 100
Billboard complete artist/chart search - subscription only
Billboard current boxscore - lists one week only - subscription only
Billboard charts archive - #1 charting only for select charts
Billboard Decade-end charts
Billboard Year-end charts

Billboard charts
K-pop
South Korean music-related lists
2009 in South Korean music
2010 in South Korean music
2011 in South Korean music
2012 in South Korean music
2013 in South Korean music
2014 in South Korean music
2015 in South Korean music
2016 in South Korean music
2017 in South Korean music
2018 in South Korean music
2019 in South Korean music
2020 in South Korean music
2000s in South Korean music
2010s in South Korean music